The 2004 General Cup was a professional non-ranking snooker tournament that took place between 11–16 September 2004 at the General Snooker Club in Hong Kong.

Issara Kachaiwong defeated Dominic Dale 6–3 in the final.


Group stage

Group A

 
 Pang Weiguo 4–2 Atthasit Mahitthi
 Pang Weiguo 3–4 Gary Wilson
 Pang Weiguo 4–1 Au Chi Wai
 Atthasit Mahitthi 4–1 Gary Wilson
 Atthasit Mahitthi 4–3 Au Chi Wai
 Gary Wilson 4–2 Au Chi Wai

Group B

 
Mark Allen 4–1 Fung Kwok Wai
Mark Allen 4–2 Mei Xi Wen
Mark Allen 4–1 Liew Kit Fatt
Fung Kwok Wai 4–2  Mei Xi Wen
Fung Kwok Wai 4–1 Liew Kit Fatt
Mei Xi Wen 4–1 Liew Kit Fatt

Group C

 
Cai Jian Zhong 4–2 Issara Kachaiwong
Cai Jian Zhong 4–3 Chan Wai Kei
Cai Jian Zhong 4–3 Pankaj Advani
Issara Kachaiwong 4–2 Chan Wai Kei
Issara Kachaiwong 4–2 Pankaj Advani
Chan Wai Kei 4–3 Pankaj Advani

Group D

 
Dominic Dale 4–2 Chan Kwok Ming
Dominic Dale 4–2 Ooi Chin Kay
Dominic Dale 4–1 Aditya Mehta
Chan Kwok Ming 4–1 Ooi Chin Kay
Chan Kwok Ming 4–2 Aditya Mehta
Ooi Chin Kay 4–3 Aditya Mehta

Knock-out stage

Century breaks

112  Mark Allen
105  Dominic Dale

References

2004
2004 in Hong Kong sport
2004 in snooker